Nayagarh (Sl. No.: 122) is a Vidhan Sabha constituency of Nayagarh district, Odisha.

This constituency includes Nayagarh, Nayagarh block and 18 Gram panchayats (Sunamuhin, Panderipada, Giridipali, Kurala, Rabigadia, Pantikhari, Korapitha, Sakeri, Sardhapur, Bhadikila, Nandighora, Arada Goudaput, Komanda, Rohibanka, Banthapur, Rabara, Ranganipatna and Odagaon nac of Odagaon Block).

Elected Members

Fifteen elections were held between 1951 and 2014.
Elected members from the Nayagarh constituency are:
 2014: (122): Arun Kumar Sahoo (BJD)
 2009: (122): Arun Kumar Sahoo (BJD)
 2004: (62): Arun Kumar Sahoo (BJD)
 2002: (62): Mandakini Behera (BJD)
 2000: (62): Bhagabat Behera (BJD)
 1995: (62): Sitakanta Mishra (Congress)
 1990: (62): Bhagabat Behera (Janata Dal)
 1985: (62): Bhagabat Behera (Janata Party)
 1980: (62): Bansidhar Sahoo (Congress-I)
 1977: (62): Bhagabat Behera (Janata Party)
 1974: (62): Bhagabat Behera (Socialist Party)
 1971: (59): Achyutananda Mohanty (Utkal Congress)
 1967: (59): Achyutananda Mohanty (Congress)
 1961: (84): Brundaban Chandra Singh (Congress)
 1957: (57): Krushna Chandra Singh Mandhata (Independent)
 1951: (93): Krushna Chandra Singh Mandhata (Independent)

2019 Election Result

2014 Election Result
In 2014 election, Biju Janata Dal candidate Arun Kumar Sahoo defeated Indian National Congress candidate Lala Manoj Kumar Ray by a margin of 20,867 votes.

2009 Election Results
In 2009 election, Biju Janata Dal candidate Arun Kumar Sahoo defeated Independent candidate Hemendra Chandra Singh by a margin of 27,341 votes.

Notes

References

Assembly constituencies of Odisha
Nayagarh district